Hiceteria is a genus of moths belonging to the subfamily Tortricinae of the family Tortricidae. The genus was erected by Alexey Diakonoff in 1953.

Species
Hiceteria heptatoma Diakonoff, 1953
Hiceteria heterogona Diakonoff, 1953
Hiceteria stannosa Diakonoff, 1953

See also
List of Tortricidae genera

References

 Diakonoff, A. (1953). Verhandelingen der Koninklijke Nederlandse Akademie van Wetenschappen. (2) 49 (3): 31.
 Brown, John W. (2005). World Catalogue of Insects. 5.

External links
Tortricid.net

Archipini
Tortricidae genera